The Hay Railway was a narrow gauge horse-drawn tramway in the district surrounding Hay-on-Wye in Brecknockshire, Wales. The railway connected Eardisley in Herefordshire, England, with Brecon in Wales. The Brecon terminus was Watton Wharf on the Brecknock and Abergavenny Canal.

Parliamentary authorisation, construction and opening

The railway received parliamentary authorisation on 25 May 1811. Construction of its winding 24-mile long route took nearly five years and the line was opened on 7 May 1816. The railway adopted the use of cast iron 'L'-shaped tramroad plates in its construction. The vertical portions of the two plates were positioned inside the wheels of the tramway wagons and the plates were spiked to stone blocks for stability. The size of the stones, and their spacing, was such that the horses could operate unimpeded.

Operation of the railway

From 1 May 1820, the Hay Railway was joined at its Eardisley terminus, in an end on junction, by the Kington Tramway. Together, the two lines totalled 36 miles in length, comprising the longest continuous plateway to be completed in the United Kingdom.

The Hay railway operated through rural areas on the borders of England and Wales and was built to transport goods and freight.  Passengers were not carried on any official basis.

The Hay Railway was absorbed into the Hereford, Hay and Brecon Railway in 1860 and the line was converted to standard gauge for operation by steam locomotives.

See also 
 Hay-on-Wye railway station
 Wagonway

References
Notes

Bibliography

 
 
 

Early Welsh railway companies
3 ft 6 in gauge railways in Wales
Railway companies established in 1811
Railway lines opened in 1816
Railway companies disestablished in 1860
Rail transport in Herefordshire
Horse-drawn railways
1811 establishments in Wales
British companies established in 1811